Christy Gunn (born ) is a Hong Kong rugby union player. She represented Hong Kong at their first World Cup in 2017.

Biography 
Gunn captained Hong Kong at the 2015 Asia Rugby Women's Championship. She was selected for the Hong Kong sevens team as they sought to secure a core team spot for the 2015–2016 Sevens Series. In November, she was called up for the sevens team in the 2015 Women's Sevens Championships which was a qualification series for the 2016 Summer Olympics.

Gunn was named in Hong Kong's training squad and then featured at the 2017 World Cup repechage tournament against Fiji and Japan. She and her husband, Stuart, married in 2017.

In January 2018, Gunn was named as co-captain of the sevens team when they competed at the Fiji Coral Coast 7s. She captained the sevens team as they competed at the 2018 Borneo Sevens in March as preparation for the Sevens Series Qualifier in April. Gunn was named again as captain at the 2018 Hong Kong Women's Sevens which was a qualifier for the 2018–19 sevens series.

References 

1985 births
Hong Kong female rugby sevens players
Hong Kong female rugby union players
Living people
Rugby union players at the 2010 Asian Games
Rugby union players at the 2014 Asian Games
Rugby union players at the 2018 Asian Games